Rowell Peak is the highest peak (1,725 m) on Reilly Ridge in the Lanterman Range, Bowers Mountains. Named by the New Zealand Antarctic Place-Names Committee (NZ-APC) in 1983 after A.J. Rowell, geologist, a member of R.A. Cooper's New Zealand Antarctic Research Program (NZARP) geological party to the area, 1981–82.

Mountains of Victoria Land
Pennell Coast